Watching is a British television sitcom, produced by Granada Television for the ITV network and broadcast for seven series and four Christmas specials between 1987 and 1993.

The series was written by Jim Hitchmough and starred Paul Bown and Emma Wray as mismatched couple Malcolm Stoneway and Brenda Wilson.

Plot
Watching was set in Merseyside, with Brenda from Liverpool and Malcolm from Meols on the Wirral, the "posh" part of Merseyside on the other side of the River Mersey. The title refers to Brenda and her sister Pamela's hobby of "people watching", and to Malcolm's hobby of birdwatching, which initially Brenda endures rather than enjoys, but later comes to appreciate. Following the idea, the episode titles are verbs in the ‘-ing’ form.

Quiet biker Malcolm, who lived with his domineering mother (played by Patsy Byrne), was accompanied on his birdwatching trips by loud scouser Brenda, who was forced to ride in the sidecar of his Norton motorbike and had a habit of rubbing his mother up the wrong way. Other key characters in the series were Brenda's sister Pamela (Liza Tarbuck), her boyfriend (later husband) David (John Bowler – Series 2 onwards) and Brenda and Pam's mother Joyce (played by Noreen Kershaw) in the last few series. The series followed Malcolm and Brenda's on/off relationship, during which Malcolm married another woman called Lucinda (played by Elizabeth Morton). However, Brenda and Malcolm finally married each other in the final episode, "Knotting", which was broadcast on 4 April 1993.

The series ran for 54 30-minute episodes over 7 series, plus two 60-minute special extended episodes.

Watching was later repeated on Granada Plus during the early 2000s and on BFBS' Forces TV from March 2022 until the channel ceased broadcasting four months later.

Series Overview

Episodes

Series 1 (1987)

Christmas Special (1987)

Series 2 (1988)

Christmas Special (1988)

Series 3 (1989)

Series 4 (1989–90)

Series 5 (1990–91)

Christmas Special (1991)

Series 6 (1992)

New Year Special (1993)

Series 7 (1993)

Cast
Emma Wray as Brenda Wilson
Paul Bown as Malcolm Stoneway
Liza Tarbuck as Pamela Wilson
Patsy Byrne as Mrs. Marjorie Stoneway
Perry Fenwick as Terry Milton (series 1–3, 7)
Philip Fox as Sidney Clough (series 1)
John Bowler as David Lynch (series 2 onwards)
Elizabeth Spriggs as Aunt Peggy (series 2, 4–5)
Liz Crowther as Susan Roberts (series 2–3)
Ann Rye as Mrs. Riley (series 3–5)
Russell Boulter as Chris Cameron (series 4)
Ken Jones as Uncle Bernard (series 5)
Noreen Kershaw as Joyce Wilson (series 5 onwards)
Andrew Hilton as Gerald Wilson (series 5 onwards)
Elizabeth Morton as Lucinda Davis/Stoneway (series 5–7)
Richard Good as Jonathan MacMillan (series 6)
Ally Vuli as Roz (series 7)
Jonathan Hackett as Julian (series 7)
Al T. Kossy as Harold
Dave Dutton as Oswald Parkins (series 1–5)
Bill Moores as "Cedric", regular at the Grapes 
Anita Petrof as "Mary", regular at the Grapes
Note: "Cedric" and "Mary" are the names given to the characters by Brenda during her people-watching days, Cedric's "real" name is unknown, but in series one episode "Repenting" Brenda reveals that she has talked to her and that "Mary"'s real name is Freda.

Production
Watching was originally conceived as a comedy sketch about a shy birdwatcher and a lively girl, written by Hitchmough during a drama workshop at the Everyman Theatre in Liverpool. He submitted the sketch for the BBC satirical series Not the Nine O'Clock News but it was rejected.

Undeterred by this, Hitchmough developed the sketch into a stage play, adapted into an afternoon play for BBC Radio 4.

Later, Watching won a commission from Granada Television to produce a seven-part series for broadcast on Sunday nights at 10pm, which was a timeslot that was usually reserved for satirical comedy such as Yorkshire Television's The New Statesman and Central's Spitting Image.

After a successful first series and subsequent Christmas special, Watching was recommissioned and moved to an earlier timeslot of 8pm on Friday nights. Up until the end of the final run (broadcast at 7pm on Sunday), the series would have audiences of over 13 million viewers.

Originally, the series was produced by David Liddiment (later to become Director of Programming at ITV) and directed by Les Chatfield, a senior director at Granada. Chatfield directed most of the episodes and took over producing duties from series 3 onwards. Liddiment became the series' executive producer.

Emma Wray sang both the opening and closing versions of the theme song, What Does He See in Me?, which was written by Charles Hart. Incidental music was written and composed by Richie Close.

Books
A novel based on the first series of Watching and written by Jim Hitchmough was published in 1990 by Bantam Books.

Home releases
A video featuring the first two episodes, "Meeting" and "Wrestling", was released by CastleVision in August 1993.

All seven series and four specials have been released on DVD. The complete first series, including the 1987 Christmas special ("Seasoning"), was released on DVD in February 2006; also released was Watching: Series 1 -Selected Episodes, which comprised three first-season episodes: "Meeting", "Outing" and "Hiding". The complete second series was released in March 2008. The complete third, fourth, fifth, sixth and seventh series including the 1988, 1991 and 1993 Christmas and New Year specials ("Twitching", "Slipping" and "Reverting"), especially a nine-disc set of the complete series, were released in April, May, July, October and November 2009. All releases on DVD by Network.

References

External links

ITV sitcoms
1987 British television series debuts
1993 British television series endings
1980s British sitcoms
1990s British sitcoms
Television shows set in Liverpool
Television series by ITV Studios
Television shows produced by Granada Television
English-language television shows
1980s British romantic comedy television series
1990s British romantic comedy television series
Television shows shot in Liverpool